Hiking in the Natal Drakensberg is a popular activity for outdoor South Africans.  The escarpment allows one to hike on a cliff of roughly 1000m high that stretches for 240 km from Sentinel Buttress in the North to Bushman's Neck Didima camp in the South.  Hiking is however not recommended for inexperienced hikers as conditions can change quickly and harsh weather can occur for extended periods.

KZN (KwaZulu-Natal) Wildlife distributes 6 1:50,000 maps that can be used while hiking in the Drakensberg.  The maps use the Cape datum as the geodesic reference.  GPS users should be careful to use the correct datum as WGS 84 is not always the default. Some GPS waypoints for the Drakensberg are listed below:

List of GPS waypoints in WGS84 format

Pass Summits
Bannerman Pass 
Beacon Buttress Gully 
Corner Pass (Rock) 
Giant's Castle Pass 
Gray's Pass 
Hilton's Pass (Rock) 
Isicatula Pass 
Judge Pass (Rock) 
Ka-Masihlenga Pass 
Langalibalele Pass 
Leslie's Pass 
Masubasuba Pass 
Mlambonja Pass 
Mzimkhulu Pass 
Ntonjelana Pass 
Organ Pipes Pass 
Ships Prow Pass (North Fork - Rock) 
Ships Prow Pass (South Fork) 
Tseketseke Pass

Caves
Didima Cave 
Fergy's Cave 
Injasuti Summit Cave 
Marble Baths Cave 
Nkosazana Cave 
Sandleni Cave 
Shepherd's Cave 
Spare Rib Cave 
Twins Cave 
Wonder Valley Cave 
Zulu Cave

Peaks
Bannerman Face 
Castle Buttress 
Cathedral Peak 
Champagne Castle Dome 
Cleft Peak 
Cockade Peak 
Erskine 
Gypaetus Point 
Injasuti Dome 
Injasuti Greater Buttress 
Injasuti Lesser Buttress 
Katana 
Mafadi 
Mashai 
Matebeng 
Mount Durnford 
No Man's Peak 
Popple Peak 
Redi 
Stimela Peak 
Tareteng 
Thabana Ntlenyana 
The Corner 
The Judge 
The Twins 
Trojan Wall 
Verkyker Peak 
Wilson's Peak

Escarpment
Stimela Saddle 
River (T43) 
River bend (W43) 
Path going around Elephant (AD49) 
Saddle (AF51) 
Saddle (AG52) 
Path behind Windsor Castle (AK54) 
Start of Yodler's Cascade Valley (AL58) 
Yodler's Cascades (AM59) 
Gully to climb up to Pampiring (AO61) 
Pampiring Saddle (AP61) 
Watershed Saddle (AQ61) 
Watershed Saddle (AU60) 
Watershed Saddle (AW62) 
Saddle (AX64) 
Spot height 3375m (AY72) 
Watershed Saddle 3360m (BA74) 
Watershed Saddle (BB74) 
Popple Saddle (BE77) 
Bannerman Face Saddle (BG80) 
Watershed Saddle (BJ89) 
Saddle 2985m (BA102)

Huts
Bannerman Hut 
Centenary Hut 
Giant's Castle Lodge 
Injasuti Hutted Camp 
Old Fire Lookout 
Sani Top Lodge 
Tseketseke Hut

Campsites
Campsite at the bottom of Cockade Pass 
Gatberg North Campsite 
Gatberg South Campsite 
Keith Bush Camp 
Monk's Cowl Forest Station 
Campsite at the bottom of Tseketseke Pass

Path Junctions
C9 
C10 
C11 
G5 
G6 
M7 
M23 
M24 
M25 
Blind Man's Corner 
Camel Pass fork in Organ Pipes Pass 
Ship's Prow Pass Fork 
Thuthumi Pass Fork on Organ Pipes Ridge 
Turnoff to Waterfall Cave

References

  Drakensberg hiking trails 
  South African Hiking Trail Guide

Hiking trails in South Africa